"My Boomerang Won't Come Back" was a novelty record by British comedian Charlie Drake which became a hit on both sides of the Atlantic in 1961.

Background
The tune concerns a young Aboriginal lad (with Drake's signature Cockney accent) cast out by his tribe due to his inability to toss a boomerang. After months of isolation (and fighting off "nasty bushwackin' animals"), the local witch doctor takes pity on the lad and tells him, "If you want your boomerang to come back/Well, first you've got to throw it!" He does, and proceeds to bring down an aeroplane, which crashes with a loud boom. "Oh, my Gawd," the lad says in horror, "I've hit The Flying Doctor!" The lad and the witch doctor argue over payment ("You still owe me fourteen chickens!") as the record fades out.

The record was produced by George Martin, who went on to even more enduring fame by producing the Beatles.  Martin used studio tricks to approximate the sound of Aboriginal instruments.

Controversy

"My Boomerang" is not exactly a paragon of political correctness, even by 1961 standards. In the song an Aboriginal meeting is described as a "pow-wow"—something more appropriate for Native Americans—while their chanting sounds more African than Aboriginal. (Oddly, many of the Aboriginal speakers in the song have either American or British accents.) Most of all, Drake raised eyebrows with the chorus: "I've waved the thing all over the place/practised till I was black in the face/I'm a big disgrace to the Aborigine race/My boomerang won't come back!"

After the BBC refused to play the tune (despite its popularity in record shops), a new version was recorded, substituting "blue in the face"; this version (on Parlophone Records) entered the UK charts in October and eventually peaked at No. 14.

When the song was initially released in the USA it contained the "black in the face" lyric which was shortly changed to "blue". British-born talk-show host Michael Jackson, then on KEWB in Oakland, thought this was silly; he claimed "black in the face" was an allusion to George Black, a British theatrical and television producer.

North American versions
United Artists released the record in America, and, not wanting to deal with complaints like the ones in Britain, issued a 45-only version that not only featured the line "blue in the face" but was considerably shorter than the UK version (which was 3:32), clocking in at 2:44 (the middle part was tightened up and the entire final bit about "The Flying Doctor" was excised, assuming American audiences would be unfamiliar with this service; after the sound of the flying boomerang, the song goes back into the chorus and fades out). The US version first hit the Billboard Hot 100 in January 1962 and peaked at No. 21, (a rare pre-Beatles hit for a British artist in the US) for what would be Drake's only American chart appearance (oddly, yet another version turned up on an American LP release, which was the same length as the US 45 but again contained the line "black in the face").

The K-Tel compilation entitled "Looney Tunes" (K-Tel NU9140, 1976) contained the full 3:32 version, with "black in the face" included.

The record also did well in Canada, reaching No. 3 there.

Australian reaction
At the time of its release, despite its less-than-respectful treatment of Aboriginal people, Australian record-buyers apparently had no problem with the original "black in the face" version. Musicologist David Kent has calculated that the song reached No. 1 there in December 1962, and a copy of the record has been archived by Music Australia.

By 2015, however, times had changed, and the Australian Broadcasting Corporation (ABC) banned the song, after a listener complained that it was racist. The ABC apologized after its Hobart-based radio program, Weekends, played the song in September of that year, at the request of a listener. Following the complaint, the broadcaster said it has removed the track completely from its system and taken steps to ensure "this would not happen again". The ABC's Audience and Consumer Affairs Department released a statement that the error was due to staff "not being familiar with the track’s lyrics".

The Worker reference
The song is referred to in Drake's ITV sitcom The Worker. In the 1969 episode "Hello, Cobbler" (coincidentally, the only one to survive in a colour version), Charlie's eponymous character is hit on the head by a boomerang and hallucinates a bizarre Australian adventure (also "politically incorrect" due to its use of actors, including Drake himself, playing Aborigine characters in blackface makeup). When he wakes up he asks, "What happened?" and is told, "Something you've always wanted--your boomerang came back!"

References

External links
Full lyrics

1961 singles
Novelty songs
1961 songs
Parlophone singles
United Artists Records singles
Song recordings produced by George Martin